The Battle of Vila Velha or Battle of Vila Velha de Ródão took place in October 1762 when a British-Portuguese force led by John Burgoyne and Charles Lee surprised and recaptured the town of Vila Velha de Ródão from Spanish invaders during the Seven Years' War as part of the Spanish invasion of Portugal. Burgoyne, who took the Spanish base at Valencia de Alcántara two months earlier then marched against forces preparing to cross the River Tagus into Alentejo.

Events

Background
On 3 October 1762 Count of Lippe in anticipation of a Spanish offensive across the Zêzere River against the Portuguese headquarters at Abrantes instructed George Townshend to march to the Beira Baixa country, marching along the left bank of the Zêzere river, to make a junction with Lord George Lennox's forces and to threaten the Spanish lines of communication with Almeida and Ciudad Rodrigo by advancing on Belmonte and Penamacor. This new march was promptly executed and Townshend's Portuguese soldiers enduring the greatest privations; but his men successfully attacked a French force escorting a convoy near Sabugal, capturing a large quantity of supplies.

Surprise Attack
The same day, the Spanish force, who had taken Vila Velha on the 2nd, advanced on Porto Cabrão, leaving behind eight artillery pieces guarded by 200 grenadiers and 100 horse. General Burgoyne, who was in charge of the defence of the south bank of the Tagus in this area, noticed that only a small force was guarding the Spanish battery at Vila Velha and ordered lieutenant-colonel Charles Lee to take the head of a detachment (100 Portuguese grenadiers, 200 men of the 85th Foot and 50 men of the 16th Light Dragoons), to pass the Tagus and to attack this position. A Portuguese grenadier of the 2nd Cascais Infantry courageously crossed the Tagus with a rope to facilitate the passage of a barge, sacrificing his life in this action.

On 7 October, Lee's detachment, using surprise, launched a night attack and surprised the Spanish camp at Vila Velha. Although they were entrenched surprise helped the British and Portuguese to manage to overpower and disperse the Spanish horse and foot inflicting considerable loss. As well as 250 Spanish killed wounded or captured, 6 guns and 60 artillery mules were acquired. Lee's main target however was the artillery depot and this was mostly burned, some of it being taken. This was achieved at a cost of only 1 man killed and 10 wounded. The town was held as Portuguese and British reinforcements arrived the next day. The taking of Vila Velha effectively ended the Spanish and French invasion campaign

Aftermath
By the middle of October the Franco-Spanish army decided to retreat back into Spain with Lippe and Townshend pursuing them. The Spanish were forced to leave their sick behind and by 24 October the Spanish and French army were back in Spain. There were a few skirmishes along the border as both sides went into Winter quarters but the Spanish would try once more in November at Olivença Marvão and Ouguela but they were repelled. On 22 November the Spanish commander Count of Aranda proposed a truce to Lippe and thus the campaign came to a conclusion.

See also
 Great Britain in the Seven Years' War

References

Bibliography
 Jaques, Tony. Dictionary of Battles and Sieges. Greenwood Press, 2007
 Kirby, Mike, The Portuguese Army - Seven Years' War, Seven Years' War Association Journal, Vol. XII No. 3
 Pereira Sales, Ernesto Augusto; O Conde de Lippe em Portugal, Vila Nova de Famalicao: Publicacoes da Comissao de Historia Militar, 1936, pp. 55–62
 McHugh, Don, and Mike Kirby, The Portugal Campaign 1762 - France and Spain Invade, Seven Years' War Association Journal Vol. XII No.
 Howson, Gerald. Burgoyne of Saratoga, Times Press, 1979

Vila Velha de Rodao (1762)
Vila Velha de Rodao (1762)
Vila Velha de Rodao(1762)
Vila Velha
Vila Velha
1762 in Portugal